Andrew Yuen may refer to:

 Andrew Yuen Man-kit (born 1972), Hong Kong actor
 Andrew Yuen Man-fai
 Andrew Yuen Chi-lok